Nan Min Aung (born 1991) is a footballer from Burma, and a winger player of Shan United FC. He is a shining star of Zeyar Shwe Myay FC. In end of the 2016 MNL season, he moved to Shan United.

References

1991 births
Living people
Sportspeople from Yangon
Burmese footballers
Myanmar international footballers
Association football forwards
Shan United F.C. players
Southern Myanmar F.C. players